The LEN Cup Winners' Cup was a European water polo club competition organized by the Ligue Européenne de Natation. National cup winners qualified for the tournament. After 2003, the nationalcup winners qualified for the LEN Euroleague, and the cup was discontinued.

Title holders

 1974-75  Ferencváros
 1975-76  Mladost 
 1976-77  MGU
 1977-78  Ferencváros
 1978-79  Korčula
 1979-80  Ferencváros
 1980-81  CSKA Moscow
 1981-82  POŠK
 1982-83  CSKA Moscow
 1983-84  POŠK 
 1984-85  Dynamo Moscow
 1985-86  Vasas
 1986-87  Mornar
 1987-88  Posillipo
 1988-89  Arenzano
 1989-90  Sisley Pescara
 1990-91  Partizan 
 1991-92  Catalunya
 1992-93  Oro d'Abruzzo Pescara 
 1993-94  Miglioli Pescara
 1994-95  Vasas
 1995-96  INA Assitalia Roma
 1996-97  Vouliagmeni
 1997-98  Ferencváros
 1998-99  Mladost 
 1999-00  Dynamo Moscow
 2000-01  Florentia
 2001-02  Vasas 
 2002-03  Carpisa Posillipo

Finals

Titles

By Club

By nation

References

 
Cup Winners' Cup
Defunct water polo competitions
Recurring sporting events established in 1974
Recurring events disestablished in 2003